Tomar (also called/spelt Tomara, Tanwar) is a clan, some members of which ruled parts of North India at different times. People belonging to the Tomara clan are found among the Rajputs, Jats 
and Gurjarsof Northern India.

Most of their population is primarily concentrated in Delhi, Haryana-Torawati and Western UP. There exists 84 villages of Tomars in Western UP alone. Besides,few areas in Northern Madhya Pradesh like Morena, Bhind and Gwalior is referred to as "Tomargarh" meaning "Fort of Tomars" due to quite large population of Tomars outside Delhi and its surrounding areas.

History 

The Tomar clan claim descent from Chandravanshi dynasty, naming the Mahabharata warrior Arjuna among their forebears.

The earliest extant historical reference to the Tomaras (the Sanskrit form of "Tomar") occurs in the Pehowa inscription of the Gurjara-Pratihara king Mahendrapala I (r. c. 885-910 CE). This undated inscription suggests that the Tomara chief Gogga was a vassal of Mahendrapala I.

During 9th-12th century, the Tomars of Delhi ruled parts of the present-day Delhi, Haryana, Western Uttar Pradesh, Gwalior and parts of Rajasthan. Much of the information about this dynasty comes from bardic legends of little historical value, and therefore, the reconstruction of their history is difficult. According to the bardic tradition, the dynasty's founder Anangapal Tomar (that is Anangapala I Tomara) founded Delhi in 736 CE. The bardic legends also state that the last Tomara King (also named Anangapal) passed on the throne of Delhi to his son-in-law Prithviraj Chauhan. This claim is subject to interpretation: historical evidence shows that Prithviraj inherited Delhi from his father Someshvara. According to the Bijolia inscription of Someshvara, his brother Vigraharaja IV had captured Dhillika (Delhi) and Ashika (Hansi); he probably defeated a Tomara ruler.

The Tomaras of Gwalior ruled an area north of Gwalior known as the Tonwargarh tract. The most notable of these rulers was Man Singh Tomar (1486-1517).

References

Bibliography 

 
 
 
 

Rajput rulers
Jat clans
Rajput clans of Delhi
Rajput clans of Rajasthan
Gurjar clans
Rajput clans of Madhya Pradesh